Sharpiegate can refer to two separate controversies:
Hurricane Dorian–Alabama controversy, about a comment made by President Trump about Hurricane Dorian
Donald J. Trump for President v. Hobbs, alleging that Sharpies were used on some ballots, causing them to be rejected